Beverly Kim is a James Beard Award-winning chef and restaurateur who was a contestant on Top Chef in 2011 and co-owns the Michelin-starred Parachute in Chicago. In 2019, Kim opened neighboring restaurant Wherewithall with her husband Johnny Clark.

Early life
Kim grew up in Downers Grove, Illinois, the daughter of Korean immigrants. She became interested in becoming a chef in high school, writing to Chicago-area chefs and landing an internship with Sarah Stegner at The Ritz-Carlton, Chicago before attending Kendall College, graduating in 2000.

Culinary career
After culinary school, Kim worked again at the Ritz, and then at Charlie Trotter's. She worked with Stegner at Prairie Grass Cafe and then became executive chef of Opera and then Aria in the Fairmont Hotel in Chicago.

In 2011, Kim competed on  Season 9 of Top Chef in Texas, winning the "Restaurant Wars" episode and the "Last Chance Kitchen" competition before finishing in fourth place.

In 2012, she was hired to take over the Michelin-starred Bonsoirée in Chicago, but the restaurant closed after two months. She then returned to her alma mater to teach a fine dining course at Kendall College's School of Culinary Arts.

In 2014, Kim and her husband, Johnny Clark, opened their own restaurant, Parachute in Avondale, Chicago, serving modern Korean-American cuisine. The restaurant was named Eater Chicago's 2014 Restaurant of the Year, and it was a finalist for the 2015 James Beard Award for Best New Restaurant. Bon Appétit magazine named it one of the country's best new restaurants in 2015. Parachute received a Michelin star in the 2016 Michelin Guide for Chicago.

In 2019, Kim and Clark won the James Beard Award for Best Chef, Great Lakes.

Personal life
Kim and her husband live in Chicago with their two children. Journalist Lee Ann Kim is her sister.

External links
 Parachute Restaurant
 Wherewithall
 Michelin Guide - Parachute

References 

Year of birth missing (living people)
Living people
People from Downers Grove, Illinois
Kendall College alumni
Chefs from Chicago
American women chefs
Asian American chefs
Chefs from Illinois
American women restaurateurs
American restaurateurs
James Beard Foundation Award winners
Top Chef contestants
Head chefs of Michelin starred restaurants
21st-century American women